

Alfred Wünnenberg (20 July 1891 – 30 December 1963) was a high-ranking commander in the Waffen-SS and the police of Nazi Germany. He commanded the SS Polizei Division between December 1941 and June 1943. He was a recipient of the Knight's Cross of the Iron Cross with Oak Leaves. On 10 June 1943, he was moved to command the IV SS Panzer Corps, where he remained until 31 August. That same year he became chief of the Ordnungspolizei (Orpo; uniformed police).

Awards and decorations
Iron Cross (1914) 2nd Class (10 February 1915) & 1st Class (9 September 1915)
Clasp to the Iron Cross (1939)  2nd Class (18 June 1940) & 1st Class (21 August 1941)
Knight's Cross of the Iron Cross with Oak Leaves
Knight's Cross on 15 November 1941 as SS-Standartenführer and Oberst of the Schupo, and commander of SS-Polizei-Schützen-Regiment 3
Oak Leaves on 23 April 1942 as SS-Brigadeführer and Generalmajor of the Police, and commander of SS-Polizei-Division

See also
List SS-Obergruppenführer

References
Citations

Bibliography

 
 

1891 births
1963 deaths
SS-Obergruppenführer
Recipients of the Knight's Cross of the Iron Cross with Oak Leaves
German police chiefs
Waffen-SS personnel
Ordnungspolizei
People from Sarrebourg
Recipients of the Iron Cross (1914), 1st class
German Army personnel of World War I